Jan Fredrik Berglund (born 21 March 1979) is a Swedish former professional footballer who played as a forward. He started off his career with IF Elfsborg in 1995 and became the Allsvenskan top scorer during the 2000 season. He then went on to represent Roda JC, Esbjerg fB, FC Copenhagen, and Stabæk before retiring at IF Elfsborg in early 2011. A full international between 2001 and 2006, he won 12 caps and scored two goals for the Sweden national team.

Club career

Early years 
Berglund started his professional career with IF Elfsborg and was a key player together with Anders Svensson and Tobias Linderoth, the three of them were nicknamed "The Headband Gang". In the 2000 season he was top goalscorer of the Allsvenskan and he attracted interest from foreign based clubs and eventually signed for Dutch side Roda JC in a €750.000 deal.

Roda JC
Berglund had a hard time in the Netherlands and after a year and a half, he was sent on loan back to Sweden and IF Elfsborg. He returned to the Netherlands for the remaining of the 2003–04 season and played a few games.

Denmark
In the spring of 2004 Berglund moved to Danish Superliga side Esbjerg fB who paid a record transfer fee of €150,000 for him. He made his debut for Esbjerg on 14 March 2004 in a game against Brøndby IF away scoring two goals and making three assists in a 6–1 win.

Berglund played two and a half years in Esbjerg before he was transferred to Danish champions F.C. Copenhagen in the summer of 2006. He played only one season with the club, playing 52 games (Danish Superliga, Danish Cup, Royal League and UEFA Champions League) and scoring 18 goals. He once again played alongside former teammate Tobias Linderoth.

On 26 November 2006, he beat Erik Bo Andersen's record of quickest person to score 50 goals in the Danish Superliga. Andersen had used 97 matches to score the 50 goals, but Berglund could, with a goal against Randers FC, score his goal no. 50 after 93 matches.

Return to Elfsborg 
In the spring of 2007, F.C. Copenhagen brought in Brazilian striker Ailton Almeida whose arrival pushed Berglund out of the starting line-up and when the club in the summer of 2007 also signed the Danish international forward Morten Nordstrand, Berglund was suddenly fourth or fifth choice for one of the two slots in the F.C. Copenhagen attack. A few days after Nordstrand's arrival, Berglund moved back to Sweden and signed once again with IF Elfsborg. The transfer fee was reported to be 4.9 million DKK, €750,000.

Berglund played his first game for Elfsborg 12 July 2007 when he came on as a substitute in a 2–0 victory at home against AIK.

Loan to Stabæk
On 31 March, ten minutes before midnight and the end of the Norwegian transfer window, 2008 champions Stabæk announced that they had signed Fredrik on a season-long loan deal.

Retirement
On 10 January 2011, Berglund officially announced his retirement from football as a player. After being sidelined a long time with constant injuries, Berglund felt he no longer had the motivation to continue playing.

International career
Berglund was capped 12 times for the Sweden national team and scored two goals. He got his debut and scored his first international goal with the national side on 10 February 2001 against Thailand in the 2001 King's Cup. He won his 12th and ultimately final international cap for Sweden on 15 November 2006 in a friendly game against the Ivory Coast.

Career statistics

International 

Scores and results list Sweden's goal tally first, score column indicates score after each Berglund goal.

Honours
IF Elfsborg
Svenska Cupen: 2000–01

Copenhagen
Danish Superliga: 2006–07

Individual
Allsvenskan top scorer: 2000

References

External links
 Career stats at Danmarks Radio 
 

1979 births
Living people
People from Borås
Swedish footballers
Association football forwards
Sweden international footballers
Allsvenskan players
Eredivisie players
Danish Superliga players
Eliteserien players
IF Elfsborg players
Roda JC Kerkrade players
Esbjerg fB players
F.C. Copenhagen players
Stabæk Fotball players
Swedish expatriate footballers
Expatriate footballers in the Netherlands
Swedish expatriate sportspeople in the Netherlands
Expatriate men's footballers in Denmark
Swedish expatriate sportspeople in Denmark
Expatriate footballers in Norway
Swedish expatriate sportspeople in Norway
Sportspeople from Västra Götaland County